Ristella guentheri, commonly known as Günther's ristella, is a species of skink, a lizard in the family Scincidae. The species is endemic to India.

Etymology
The specific name, guentheri, is in honor of German-British herpetologist Albert Günther.

Geographic range
R. guentheri is found in India, in Madurai district, Tenmalai, Travancore, and the Anaimalai Hills.

The type locality is "Madura, Sirimallay Hills" (= Sirumalai Hills, Madurai district).

References

Further reading
Smith MA (1935). The Fauna of British India, Including Ceylon and Burma. Reptilia and Amphibia. Vol. II.—Sauria. London: Secretary of State for India in Council. (Taylor and Francis, printers). xiii + 440 pp. + Plate I + 2 maps. (Ristella guentheri, p. 332).

Ristella
Reptiles described in 1887
Taxa named by George Albert Boulenger